This is a list of elections in Canada in 2015. Included are provincial, municipal and federal elections, by-elections on any level, referendums and party leadership races at any level.

January to April
January 8 - Municipal by-election in Happy Valley-Goose Bay, Newfoundland and Labrador
February 5 - Provincial by-election in Sudbury, Ontario
February 9 - Territorial by-election in Uqqummiut, Nunavut
February 10 - Municipal by-election in Camrose, Alberta
February 15 - Mayoral and council by-elections in Amos, Quebec
February 21 - 2015 Prince Edward Island Liberal Party leadership election
February 28 - 2015 Progressive Conservative Party of Prince Edward Island leadership election
March 1 - Municipal by-election in Port-Cartier, Quebec
March 7:
2015 New Democratic Party of Manitoba leadership election
Newfoundland and Labrador New Democratic Party leadership election, 2015
Pouce Coupe, British Columbia municipal by-election
March 8 - Mayoral and municipal by-elections in Plessisville, Quebec
March 9 - Provincial by-election in Richelieu, Quebec
March 17 - Municipal by-election in Bruderheim, Alberta
March 22 - Outremont borough council by-election in Robert-Bourassa District, Montreal
March 23 - Municipal by-election in Brazeau County, Alberta
March 28 - Wildrose Party leadership election
March 30 - Municipal by-election in Wood Buffalo, Alberta
April 13 - Calgary Board of Education school trustee by-election
April 21 - Provincial by-election in The Pas, Manitoba.
April 25 - Bulkley-Nechako Regional District Electoral Area "D" (Fraser Lake Rural) by-election
March 22 - Municipal by-election in the borough Outremont, Quebec.
March 30 - Municipal by-election in Fort Erie, Ontario
April 19 - Municipal by-election in Melbourne, Quebec
April 26 - Municipal by-election in Dorval, Quebec
April 27 - Municipal by-election for Ward 4 on Mississauga City Council

May to August
May 4:
Prince Edward Island general election
Municipal by-elections in Campobello Island, Fredericton, Miramichi, Nigadoo, Port Elgin and Shediac, New Brunswick
May 5 - Alberta general election
May 9:
2015 Progressive Conservative Party of Ontario leadership election
Municipal by-election in Guysborough County, Nova Scotia
May 15 - 2015 Parti Québécois leadership election
March 16 - May 29 - 2015 Metro Vancouver Transportation and Transit Plebiscite
June 8 - Provincial by-elections in Chauveau and Jean-Talon, Quebec
June 17 - Municipal by-election in Neepawa, Manitoba
June 22 - Municipal by-election in Carstairs, Alberta
June 24 - Municipal by-election in St. Albert, Alberta
June 29:
Municipal by-election in Atholville, New Brunswick
Municipal by-election in Pincher Creek, Alberta
July 4 - Municipal by-election in the District of Lakeland No. 521, Saskatchewan
July 7 - Municipal by-election in Moosonee, Ontario
July 13 - Municipal by-election for Ward 6 on Oakville Town Council
July 14 - Provincial by-elections in Dartmouth South, Cape Breton Centre and Sydney-Whitney Pier, Nova Scotia
August 6 - Municipal by-election in Saddle Hills County, Alberta
August 16 - School board by-election for Commission scolaire de la Capitale
August 22 - Municipal by-election in West Hants, Nova Scotia
August 27 - Municipal by-election in Howick, Ontario
August 30 - Municipal by-election in Verchères, Quebec

September to October
September 2 - Municipal by-election in the Rural Municipality of La Broquerie, Manitoba
September 3 - Provincial by-elections in Simcoe North, Ontario and Calgary-Foothills, Alberta
September 9 - Municipal by-election and referendum in Nipawin, Saskatchewan
September 16 - Municipal by-election in Meadow Lake, Saskatchewan
September 21 - Municipal by-election in Halton Hills, Ontario
September 22 - Municipal by-election in Bruderheim, Alberta
September 28 - Edmonton Public School Board school trustee by-election.
October 5 - Provincial by-election in Carleton, New Brunswick
October 15 - Yukon municipal elections, 2015
October 19:
Canadian federal election
Iqaluit municipal elections, 2015
Northwest Territories municipal elections, 2015 (taxed communities)
October 24 - Municipal by-election in Kings County, Nova Scotia
October 25 - Municipal by-election in Témiscouata-sur-le-Lac, Quebec
October 26 - Municipal by-election in Maple Creek, Saskatchewan
October 28 - Municipal by-election in the Rural Municipality of Sherwood No. 159, Saskatchewan
October 29 - Municipal by-election in Morris, Manitoba

November to December
November 4 - Saskatchewan municipal elections, 2015 (even-numbered rural municipalities)
November 7 - Municipal by-election in Pemberton, British Columbia
November 8 - Municipal by-elections in Pontiac and Otter Lake, Quebec
November 9:
Provincial by-elections in Beauce-Sud, Fabre, René-Lévesque and Saint-Henri–Sainte-Anne, Quebec
Municipal amalgamation plebiscites in Haut-Madawaska (upper Madawaska County) and Sussex/Sussex Corner, New Brunswick.
November 15 - Municipal by-election in Saint-Léonard-Est District on Montreal City Council.
November 16:
Municipal by-election in Wellington North, Ontario
Municipal by-election in Rocky View County, Alberta
November 19 - Sunrise School Division school trustee by-election
November 21 - Municipal by-election in West Hants, Nova Scotia
November 23:
 Northwest Territories general election
 Municipal by-elections in Uxbridge and The Archipelago, Ontario
 Municipal by-election in Thorsby, Alberta
November 29 - Municipal by-elections in Brossard, Rivière-du-Loup and Mont-Joli, Quebec.
November 30 - Newfoundland and Labrador general election
December 6 - Nunavut municipal elections, 2015 (hamlets)
December 13:
By-election for English Montreal School Board Commissioner in District #4 (Côte Saint-Luc/Hampstead).
Municipal by-election in Drummondville, Quebec
December 20 - Municipal by-election in Granby, Quebec

Unknown date
Green Party of British Columbia leadership election
Northwest Territories general election
Progressive Conservative Association of Alberta leadership election
Progressive Conservative Party of New Brunswick leadership election

References

See also
Municipal elections in Canada
Elections in Canada

 
Political timelines of the 2010s by year